Forests in the state of Himachal Pradesh (northern India) currently cover an area of nearly , which is about 68.16% of the total land area of the state. The forests were once considered to be the main source of income of the state and most of the original forests were clear felled. The emphasis has shifted, however, from exploitation to conservation. The state government aims to increase forest cover to 50% of the total land area. There have been various projects, including the establishment of protected areas such as National Parks, designed to preserve and expand the forests.

Preservation and nationalisation of forests
Steps are being taken to intensify environmental preservation and sustainable development in the Himachal Pradesh region. All remaining forests in Himachal Pradesh have been nationalised under the supervision of the officers like Indian forest service, Himachal Forest Service and seasoned Range/Dy.Range Forest Officers. Felling of trees and sale of timber is now controlled by the State Forest Corporation, and an Enforcement Organisation has been established to prevent the illegal felling of trees and the smuggling of timber. Hunting has also been restricted.

The government has created 33 Sanctuaries, and two National Parks. Additional national parks sites are proposed.

Reforestation programs
A World Bank assisted Social Forestry Project has been launched. The aim of the project is to plant more trees for fuel, fodder, and timber to meet the basic requirements of the local people, thus avoiding depletion of the old growth forests. The deforested Kandi areas are also being reafforested in another project financially assisted by the World Bank.

Other programs
An integrated water shed department project for Shivaliks is also under construction.

Fact and figures

Sanctuaries and National Parks
Himachal Pradesh has five national parks and thirty-two wildlife sanctuaries, which are listed below:

Gallery

References

External links
himachaltourism.nic.in
hptdc.gov.in

 
H
Environment of Himachal Pradesh
Lists of tourist attractions in Himachal Pradesh